"It's Your Love" is a song written by Stephony Smith and originally recorded by American country music artist Tim McGraw. It was released in May 1997 as the first single from his album Everywhere. The song, featuring wife Faith Hill, reached number one on the Billboard Hot Country Songs chart in its fifth week on the chart. The song stayed there for six weeks (the first time a song spent that many weeks there since "Luckenbach, Texas (Back to the Basics of Love)" in 1977), and became McGraw's and Hill's first top-ten hit on the Billboard Hot 100, peaking at number seven. American pop trio She Moves covered the song in 1997.

"It's Your Love" became the first duet by a married couple to top the country chart since the inception of Nielsen BDS in 1990. No such single would top the chart again until almost 26 years later, when Kane Brown and Katelyn Brown's "Thank God" topped the chart in February 2023.

Music video
The music video was directed and produced by Sherman Halsey, and premiered on CMT on May 14, 1997, when CMT named it a "Hot Shot". Hill was pregnant with the couple's oldest daughter Gracie Katherine when it was filmed.

Track listing
Promo CD
It's Your Love (Hot A/C Mix) 
Single
It's Your Love 3:40 	
She Never Lets It Go To Her Heart 3:02

Awards

Academy of Country Music Awards

Country Music Association

Grammy Awards

Charts

Tim McGraw and Faith Hill version

Year-end charts

She Moves version

Certifications

Other versions
German singer Gil Ofarim recorded a cover of this song.
American boy bands Natural and LMNT each recorded a cover of the song for their albums Keep It Natural and All Sides, respectively.
S Club singer Jo O'Meara recorded a cover of this song for her solo album Relentless in 2005.
French pop singer Cherie covered the song for her debut album in 2004.

References

1997 singles
1997 songs
Tim McGraw songs
Faith Hill songs
She Moves songs
Billboard Hot Country Songs number-one singles of the year
Music videos directed by Sherman Halsey
Song recordings produced by Byron Gallimore
Song recordings produced by James Stroud
Songs written by Stephony Smith
Curb Records singles
EMI Records singles
Geffen Records singles
Male–female vocal duets
Country ballads
Pop ballads